Kuldeep Pawar (10 June 1949 – 24 March 2014) was an Indian actor in the Marathi language film industry of India.

Early life 
He was born in Kolhapur in Maharashtra. His grandfather worked for electric power house started by His Highness Shahu Maharaj and his father acted in small roles in Marathi films. Kuldeep studied in St.Xavier school and Rajaram College in Kolhapur.

Career 
He moved to Bombay (now Mumbai) where he was given chance by Marathi drama director Prabhakar Panshikar to act in Marathi drama Ethe Oshalala Mrutyu as character of Sambhaji. His key films include Jhaatyache Jaale, Darodekhor, Bin Kamacha Navra, Shapit, Are Sansar Sansar, Sarja, Eka Peksha Ek, Vajir, Gupchup Gupchup, Vedh and Shrinath Mhaskobacha Changabhala. He also acted in famous TV serial "Tu Tu Main Main" directed by Sachin, and Paramveer.

A versatile actor, Pawar was one of the few actors who managed a perfect balance between comic and negative roles in Marathi theatre, films and tele serials. Kuldeep had worked in a play titled 'Rakheli' in which he had played a character called 'Daddy'. Since then the industry people address him by the same name.

Some Kuldeep Pawar Films
 Mardani (1983)
 Gupchup Gupchup (1983)
 Aali Laher Kela Kahar (1984)
 Gosht Dhamal Namyachi (1984)
 Aai Tuljabhavani  (1986)
 Doodh Ka Karz (1990)
 Jeet (1996)
 Javayachi Jat (19xx)
 Vazir (1994)
 Arre... Devaa (2007)
 Gulabrao Zavade (2010)
 Jau Tithe Khau
 Arre Sansar Sansar
 Vartaman
 Bin Kamacha Navra (1984)
 Navre Sagale Gadhav (1982)

Dramas
 Rakheli
 Pati Sagale Uchapati
 Ithe Oshadla Mrityu (Sambhaji)
 Viz Mhanali Dhartil (Tatya Tope)
 Ashrunchi Zaale Fule (Shambhu Mahadev)
 Asaahi Ek Aurangzeb (Aurangzeb)

Television Serials 
 Paramveer
 Damini
 Tu Tu Main Main
 Sansaar
 Aakrosh

Personal life 
He is survived by his two children and wife Nilima, also a theatre person.

Death 
He died on 24 March 2014 due to kidney failure in Kokilaben hospital at Mumbai.

References

External links
 

Pawar,Kuldeep
2014 deaths
1949 births
People from Kolhapur
Male actors in Hindi television
Male actors in Marathi cinema
20th-century Indian male actors
21st-century Indian male actors